Chariesthes donovani is a species of beetle in the family Cerambycidae. It was described by Karl Jordan in 1903, originally under the genus Hapheniastus. It is known from Sierra Leone, Cameroon, Ivory Coast, Gabon, Benin, Ghana, and Togo.

References

Chariesthes
Beetles described in 1903